The Galician People's Union-Proletarian Line (UPG-lp) was a galician independentist and communist party that supported armed struggle. They edited the magazine Terra e Tempo.

History
Fruit of a split of the Galician People's Union, which occurred in 1977 when Xosé Luís Méndez Ferrín, who accused the UPG of rightism, gradual compliance of the Spanish institutions and interclasism, was expelled from the organization due to their discrepancies in the policy union, his opposition to the legalization of the ING, on the participation in the elections and also for his support to the armed struggle. A significant number of militants followed Ferrín and departed from the organization. In the general elections of 1977 the party called for abstention.

It was renamed in March 1978 as the Galician Party of the Proletariat.

References

1977 establishments in Spain
1978 establishments in Spain
Defunct communist militant groups
Defunct communist parties in Spain
Defunct socialist parties in Galicia (Spain)
Galician nationalist parties
Left-wing militant groups in Spain
Left-wing nationalist parties
Political parties disestablished in 1978
Political parties established in 1977
Secessionist organizations in Europe